The 2015 Speedway European Championship season was the third season of the Speedway European Championship (SEC) era, and the 15th UEM Individual Speedway European Championship. It was the third series under the promotion of One Sport Lts. of Poland.

The championship was won by Russia's Emil Sayfutdinov for the second season in succession. The Russian finished three points ahead of Danish rider Nicki Pedersen. Third place went to Antonio Lindbäck, who was another four points behind Pedersen. Janusz Kołodziej and Martin Vaculík secured the final two qualifying spots for the 2016 season by finishing fourth and fifth respectively.

Qualification 
For the 2015 season, 15 permanent riders were joined at each SEC Final by one wild card and two track reserves.

Defending champion, Emil Sayfutdinov from Russia was automatically invited to participate in all final events. Peter Kildemand, Nicki Pedersen, Martin Vaculík and Janusz Kołodziej secured their participation in all final events thanks to being in the top five of the general classification in the 2014 season.

Tomasz Gollob,  Antonio Lindbäck and Martin Smolinski received and accepted a wild card to compete in the 2015 Speedway European Championships.

Qualified riders

Calendar

Qualification 
The calendar for qualification consisted of 3 Semifinal events and one SEC Challenge event.

Championship Series 
A four-event calendar was scheduled for the final series, with events in Poland, Germany and Sweden.

Classification

See also 
 2015 Speedway Grand Prix

References

External links 

 

2015
European Championship
Speedway European Championship